Thailavaram is a village located between Guduvancheri and Potheri of Maraimalai Nagar municipality in Chengalpattu District in Tamil Nadu, India. 
The PIN Code of Thailavaram is 603 203.

L&T's Estanzia IT SEZ (Special Economic Zone) is located just opposite to this village.

Kalyana Anjaneya Temple is an important temple here as God Kalyana Anjaneya is with his Consort Suvarchala Devi.

Etymology of Thailavaram
Etymology: The village received its name Thailavaram ("Thaila" means Eucalyptus (Thailamaram) and "varam" means gift literally in Tamil). Eucalyptus trees are found abundant in this village which are nature's gift.

Geography
Thailavaram is a developing village located along National Highway 32 near Guduvancheri that connects Chennai with the cities in southern and western Tamil Nadu. Nearest town's are Guduvancheri and Potheri.

Guduvancheri is located just two kilometers from the village Thailavaram. Important locations nearby are L&T's Estanzia IT SEZ (Special Economic Zone), Valliammai Engineering College, SRM Institute of Science and Technology which are at a throw-away distance from this village.

The village once known for its agricultural lands but which is losing its scenic beauty due to very rapid development of the suburb's near chennai city and SEZ (Special Economic Zone's)

Transportation
Thailavaram is well connected by roads, as it is located near Chennai, between Tambaram and Chengalpattu State Road highway.
Nearest Railway stations are Guduvancheri and Potheri.  Frequent Tamil Nadu State run TNSTC buses are available.

See also
 Guduvancheri
 Potheri
 SRM Institute of Science and Technology
 Valliammai Engineering College
 Kattankulathur
 Urapakkam

References

 http://www.hindu.com/thehindu/nic/vishnu/index.htm
 http://centralexcisechennai.gov.in/chennai3/jurisdiction_tambaram1.html
 https://archive.today/20121218160813/http://municipality.tn.gov.in/maraimalainagar/salient_street_lights.html
 https://web.archive.org/web/20120514202703/http://www.tnpcb.gov.in/seiaa/ec/107_EC.pdf
 http://centralexcisechennai.gov.in/chennai3/excise%20tradenotices/TN_2008/TN%2017-08.htm
 http://www.tn.gov.in/stationeryprinting/gazette/2008/VI-1.pdf
 https://web.archive.org/web/20081101090007/http://www.tnpcb.gov.in/seiaa/appli.htm
 https://web.archive.org/web/20120425111954/http://www.elections.tn.nic.in/BLO_list/ac032.pdf

Villages in Chengalpattu district